Thinner may refer to: 
Paint thinner, a solvent used in painting and decorating, for thinning oil-based paint and cleaning brushes.
Thinner (novel), a 1984 horror novel by Stephen King, written as Richard Bachman
Thinner (film), a 1996 horror film based on the novel by Stephen King
Thinner (netlabel), a German netlabel releasing electronic music